Nicola Sturgeon formed the third Sturgeon government following her Scottish National Party's victory in the 2021 Scottish Parliament election. Sturgeon was nominated by a vote of the 6th Scottish Parliament for appointment to the post of First Minister on 18 May 2021 and announced the formation of a new Scottish National Party minority government on 20 May.

Sturgeon is the first First Minister to form a third administration. Her cabinet, like her previous two, is 50/50 gender neutral. On 31 August 2021, the SNP and Scottish Greens entered a power-sharing arrangement which resulted in the appointment of two Green MSPs as junior ministers in the government, delivery of a shared policy platform, and Green support for the government on votes of confidence and supply.

Following Sturgeon’s decision to resign as Scottish First Minister and Leader of the SNP in February 2023, her government will continue in a caretaker capacity until a new leader is elected by the party.

History 
In the May 2021 Scottish Parliament election, the Scottish National Party (SNP) won 64 of the 129 seats contested. Incumbent First Minister Nicola Sturgeon soon afterwards announced her intention to form a minority government. She was nominated for the post of first minister by a vote of the Scottish Parliament on 18 May, defeating Scottish Conservative leader Douglas Ross and Scottish Liberal Democrat leader Willie Rennie by 64 votes to 31 and 4 respectively.

Long standing ministers Jeane Freeman, Michael Russell, Roseanna Cunningham and Aileen Campbell did not seek re-election to the 6th Scottish Parliament, with Fiona Hyslop and Fergus Ewing standing down from government. This left Sturgeon with many empty posts.

Shortly after being elected, Sturgeon re-appointed John Swinney as Deputy First Minister of Scotland and also appointed him the newly created Cabinet Secretary for Covid Recovery post. Humza Yousaf, Kate Forbes, Shirley-Anne Somerville and Michael Matheson all remained in government. Shona Robison and Keith Brown made a return to cabinet, having previously served in Sturgeon's governments. Only Mairi Gougeon and Angus Robertson were new to cabinet. The Scottish Parliament confirmed the appointment of ministers and junior ministers on 20 May.In May 2021, both the Lord Advocate, James Wolffe, and Solicitor General for Scotland, Alison Di Rollo, announced their intention to step down as Scotland's top law officers. On 17 June, Sturgeon nominated Dorothy Bain QC  to serve as Lord Advocate and Ruth Charteris QC to serve as Solicitor General. This is the first time in history both posts have been held by women.

On 20 August 2021, following two months of negotiations, the SNP and Scottish Greens announced a new power-sharing agreement. While not an official coalition, it would be the first time in both Scottish and UK history that Green politicians would be in government. The Greens hold two ministerial posts. The agreement will see both parties pledge for a second referendum on Scottish independence, an increase investment in active travel and public transport, enhancing tenants rights, a ten-year £500m Just Transition and establishing a National Care Service.

Cabinet

May 2021 – present

Changes 
 Leslie Evans stood down as the Permanent Secretary to the Scottish Government in January 2022 and was replaced by John-Paul Marks.

List of junior ministers

May 2021 – present

Changes 
 Graeme Dey resigned as Minister for Transport and was replaced by Jenny Gilruth, the Minister for Culture, Europe and International Development. Gilruth was succeeded by Neil Gray who was appointed Minister for Culture, Europe and International Development and Minister with special responsibility for Refugees from Ukraine.
 Ash Regan resigned as Minister for Community Safety in October 2022. Elena Whitham was appointed as the new Minister for Community Safety in November 2022.

Scottish Law Officers

Notes

References 

Scottish governments
Cabinets established in 2021
2021 establishments in Scotland
Nicola Sturgeon
Ministries of Elizabeth II
Ministries of Charles III
Current governments